The History of Diving Museum is located in the Islamorada, Florida which is in the Florida Keys. The museum's exhibits include a collection of vintage underwater diving equipment, a notable collection of diving helmets and various artifacts that are dedicated to the history of underwater diving.

History

The not-for-profit museum was founded by Joe and Sally Bauer, retired physicians. A chance purchase of a diving helmet had started their interest in diving and the ocean. They wrote scientific articles on oceanic topics, and assembled a large collection of diving artifacts. In 2000, they started turning a self-storage warehouse in Islamorada into a museum. It opened to the public in 2005 and was in full operation the next year. Joe died in 2007 and his widow Sally continued the work.

Exhibits
As of 2014, the museum had 13 exhibits on diving history, beginning with a story from the 3-4 thousand year old Epic of Gilgamesh. Diving pioneers such as Edmond Halley and Karl Heinrich Klingert are included. The museum has a large collection of diving helmets from over 20 countries. The collection includes atmospheric diving suits such as the 1930 "Iron Mike".

Recognition
Sally Bauer was inducted into the Women Divers Hall of Fame in 2011. She received the NOGI Award in 2019. The mayor of Islamorada proclaimed January 12, 2019, to be "Dr. Sally Bauer Day". 

The Bauers were also both founding members of the US and UK branches of the Historical Diving Society.

Gallery

References

External links

Florida Keys Museum Traces History of Diving, video at FloridaKeysTV
Sally Bauer M.D. at Women Divers Hall of Fame

Museums in Key West, Florida
Tourist attractions in Key West, Florida
Museums established in 2000
Maritime museums in Florida
History of underwater diving